Val de Livre is a commune in the Marne department, northern France. The municipality was established on 1 January 2016 and consists of the former communes of Tauxières-Mutry and Louvois.

See also 
Communes of the Marne department

References 

Communes of Marne (department)